Dàimh (pronounced "dive") is a folk band which performs in Scottish Gaelic.

Its members are Angus MacKenzie (whistle/bagpipes), Gabe McVarish (fiddle), Ellen MacDonald (voice/bagpipes), Murdo Cameron (mandolin/accordion) and Ross Martin (guitar). In addition, Calum Alex MacMillan sang with them on their album Crossing Point.

Dàimh was established in the western Gàidhealtachd as this was the homeland of the original members. Angus MacKenzie is from Mabou, Nova Scotia, on Cape Breton Island; Gabe McVarish is from California; Ross Martin is from Arisaig; Griogair Labhruidh is from Balloch; and Murdo Cameron from Glenelg.

The group has released seven albums.

Discography 
 Moidart to Mabou (2000)
 1. Welcome to Scotsville
 2. Go Jerry!
 3. Oran Eile do'n Phrionnsa
 4. Goat Island
 5. Nighean Donn a' Chuailein Riomhaich
 6. Strathspeys & Reels
 7. The King
 8. The Brown One
 9. Song & March
 10. Polkas
 11. Wise Maid Set
 Pirates of Puirt (2004)
 1. Supernose
 2. Wreckd ‘er
 3. Slippy Sean’s
 4. The Funny Whistle
 5. Bonny Doon
 6. C Tune
 7. Toad
 8. The Sandy Lad
 9. Mazurka
 10. The Lady’s Dance
 Crossing Point (2007) Greentrax
 1. Dòmhnaill Mòr
 2. Mo Nighean Chruinn Donn
 3. Trip to Glenfinnan
 4. Anxo's
 5. Nuair a Chi Thu Caileag Bhòidheach
 6. Turbo Shandy
 7. Òran a Mhagarine
 8. Murdo's
 9. Sealg a's Sùgradh nan Gleann
 10. Eathar Dubh a Bradhagair
 11. Dram
 12. Polkas
 Diversions (2010)
 1. Sporan Dhòmhnaill
 2. Ida’s Jig
 3. Mo Mhàili Bheag Òg
 4. Lads and Lasses
 5. An Caol Loch Eilt
 6.Taighean Geala
 7.‘S dubh choisich mi ‘n oidhche
 8. Clann Mhàrtainn
 9. He ‘m èille
 10. Lock and Load
 11. Nan ceadaicheadh an tìde dhomh
 Tuneship (2014)
 1. Raasay
 2. Barra to Balloch
 3. Coddywatch
 4. Siud Agaibh an Deoch a dh’ Òlainn
 5. Bottle for Brigg
 6. Stormy Hill
 7. Hiù ra bhò Nuair a Chaidh mi a Ghlaschu
 8. The Gannet
 9. Mo Ghleannan Taobh Loch Lìobhann
 10. Banjo's Favourite
 The Hebridean Sessions (2015)
 1. Locheil's awa’ to France
 2. Dhannsamaid le Ailean
 3. O fair a-nall am botal
 4. Bog an Iochan
 5. Mike MacDougall's O' KEeefe's Pattern day
 6. Cuir a-nall Mor-a-bhitheag
 7. Gur e mo ghille dubh dhonn
 8. Biodag aig MacThomais
 9. Oran an tombaca
 10. The Lassies Fashion
 The Rough Bounds (2018)
 1. ’S Trusaidh mi na Coilleagan
 2. 12th of June
 3. Tha Fadachd orm Fhìn
 4. Donald MacLeod Reels
 5. Òran Bhàgh a’ Chàise
 6. Mary's Fancy
 7. A Nìghneag a Ghràidh
 8. Bodach Innse Chrò
 9. Happy Fish
 10. Turas Dhòmhsa Chun na Galldachd
 11. Chì mi’n Toman

Other performances 
The band played at the Cèilidh a' Cho-fhlaitheis at Pacific Quay beside the BBC building in Glasgow in 2014. Dòmhnall Seathach performed with them. They were recorded on BBC Alba.

References

External links 
 Official website
 
 SoundCloud page

Celtic music groups
Scottish Gaelic music
Scottish folk music groups